Sayaji Rao Gaekwad (Born ?, died 1792) was the Maharaja of Baroda (r.1768 - 1778).  He was the eldest son of Damaji Rao Gaekwad.

See also
Gaekwad dynasty

References

External links
 Official Website of the Gaekwads of Baroda

1792 deaths
Sayaji Rao I
Maharajas of Vadodara
Year of birth unknown
Hindu monarchs
Indian royalty
Indian military leaders